Polytomella is a genus of green algae in the family Dunaliellaceae. Polytomella is a free-living, flagellated, nonphotosynthetic green alga with a highly reduced, linear fragmented mitochondrial genome. Polytomella, as it exists today, bears evidence of once having a functional photosynthetic plastid which has over evolutionary time changed such that it would appear now to have no genome or gene expressing mechanisms remaining to it. Having transitioned completely to heterotrophy, Polytomella uses organic acids, alcohols and monosaccharides as its carbon source. Despite being an evolutionary descendant of the green algae, Polytomella is a colourless organism because it has lost its photosynthetic ability.

References

External links

Chlamydomonadales
Chlamydomonadales genera